Naughty Bits was a comic book series written and illustrated by Roberta Gregory, and published by Fantagraphics Books. The series ran from March 1991 to July 2004, totalling 40 issues.

Naughty Bits is the story of Midge McCracken, aka Bitchy Bitch, an everyday woman angry at the world who frequently explodes with rage. The character made her first appearance in the Fantagraphics anthology Graphic Story Monthly #6 (June 1990). The comic has also appeared in animated form as Bitchy Bits and Life's a Bitch.

The stories in Naughty Bits are set in the present day. Bitchy Bitch has a lesbian counterpart named Bitchy Butch.

Collections 
A Bitch is Born:  Adventures of Midge the Bitchy Bitch (Fantagraphics, 1994) 
Naughty Bits vol. 2: As Naughty as She Wants to Be (Fantagraphics 1996)  — collecting material considered too controversial for the first Naughty Bits collection
At Work and Play with Bitchy Bitch (Fantagraphics, 1996)  — material from Naughty Bits #10-14
Bitchy's College Daze: Adventures of Midge the Bitchy Bitch (Fantagraphics, 1998) — stories from Naughty Bits #15-19
Bitchy Butch: World's Angriest Dyke (Fantagraphics, 1999)  — stories from Naughty Bits #21, 23, 26, and stories from Gay Comix
Bitchy Strips (self-published, 2001) — one-shot collection of weekly strips previously published in alternative weeklies such as the Seattle Weekly and Willamette Week  
Burn Bitchy Burn (Fantagraphics, 2002) 
Life's a Bitch: Complete Bitchy Bitch Stories (Fantagraphics, 2005)  — first half of Bitchy Bitch stories plus one new story

Reception 
Paul Constant of The Stranger  called Naughty Bits "one of the best comic series I've ever read. ... It's basically a biography of one normal—albeit kinda hateful—woman, and it's insightful, funny, and true."

Naughy Bits was nominated for Best New Series in the 1992 Harvey Awards, and was nominated for Best Humor Publication in the 1992 Eisner Awards. "Hippie Bitch Gets Laid," in Naughty Bits #6, was nominated for Best Short Story in the 1993 Eisners. That same year, Gregory was nominated for the Best Writer and Best Writer/Artist Eisner Awards. Naughty Bits #6-8, the "Abortion Trilogy", was nominated for a 1994 Eisner for Best Serialized Story, and Gregory was again nominated in the Best Writer/Artist category. "Bye-Bye, Muffy," in Naughty Bits #28, was nominated for Best Short Story in the 2000 Eisner Awards.

In other media 
Beginning in 2001, a series of shorts featuring Bitchy Bitch called Bitchy Bits was shown on the  Oxygen Network  animated series X-Chromosome.

Life's a Bitch, an animated series spun-off from the X-Chromosome shorts, aired from 2003–2004 on Oxygen in the U.S. and on The Comedy Network in Canada.

See also

 List of feminist comic books
 Portrayal of women in comics

References

External links
Naughty Bits at the Grand Comics Database

1991 comics debuts
2004 comics endings
Comics about women
Fantagraphics titles
Feminist comics